Daviesia uncinata is a species of flowering plant in the family Fabaceae and is endemic to the south-west of Western Australia. It is a densely-branched shrub with many stems, hooked, needle-shaped, sharply pointed phyllodes continuous with the branchlets and rich yellow and pinkish-red flowers.

Description

Taxonomy
Daviesia uncinata was first formally described in 1995 by Michael Crisp in Australian Systematic Botany from specimens collected by Crisp near Yoting in 1979. The specific epithet (uncinata) means "hooked" or "barbed" referring to phyllodes.

Distribution and habitat
This daviesia grows in kwongan in the area between Kellerberrin, Piesseville and Lake Magenta in the Avon Wheatbelt and Mallee bioregions of south-western Western Australia.

Conservation status
Daviesia uncinata is classified as "Priority Three" by the Government of Western Australia Department of Biodiversity, Conservation and Attractions, meaning that it is poorly known and known from only a few locations but is not under imminent threat.

References

uncinata
Taxa named by Michael Crisp
Plants described in 1995
Flora of Western Australia